Adama Diakité (born 8 October 1993) is an Ivorian footballer who plays for Italian  club Torres.

Biography
Born in Memni, Alépé Department, Ivory Coast, Diakité moved to Italy at a young age. Diakité was a player for Madonna Alta Perugia in 2007. He was a player for the reserve team of Calcio Padova from 2009 to 2012. He made his Serie B debut in the last round of 2011–12 Serie B.

On 20 August 2012, he was signed by Lega Pro Prima Divisione (ex–Serie C1) club AlbinoLeffe in temporary deal, with Matteo Piccinni moved to opposite direction. Padova did not sign Piccinni outright; AlbinoLeffe also did not excise the option on Diakité.

Diakité returned to Padua in July 2013. He played 7 Serie B games for the second division struggler, in which the team was relegated to Lega Pro at the end of season.

On 6 August 2014, he was signed by Casertana.

On 17 December 2018, he was signed by Savoia.
In August 2020, Diakité signed for Serie D side A.S.G. Nocerina, on a one-year contract.

Personal life
Adama's family lives in Belgium; his father lives in Perugia. Adama's grandfather died in 2014.

References

External links
 AIC profile (data by football.it) 
 

Ivorian footballers
Calcio Padova players
U.C. AlbinoLeffe players
Serie B players
Serie C players
Serie D players
S.E.F. Torres 1903 players
Ivorian expatriate footballers
Ivorian expatriate sportspeople in Italy
Expatriate footballers in Italy
Association football forwards
People from Lagunes District
1993 births
Living people